List of Ekushey Padak award recipients in 2020s.

2020
It was awarded to 20 people and 1 organisation.

 Aminul Islam Badsha, language movement (posthumous)
 Begum Dalia Nausheen, music
 Shankar Roy, music
 Mita Haque, music 
 Golam Mostafa Khan, dance
 SM Mohsin, acting
 Farida Zaman, art 
 Haji Aktar Sardar, liberation war (posthumous)
AAM Mesbahul Haque, liberation war
 Abdul Jabbar, liberation war (posthumous)
 Zafar Wazed, journalism
 Jahangir Alam Khan, research
 Syed Mohammad Saifur Rahman, research
 Bikiran Prasad Barua, education
 Shamsul Alam, economics
 Sufi Mohammed Mizanur Rahman, social welfare
 Nuran Nabi, language and literature 
 Sikder Aminul Haq, language and literature (posthumous)
 Nazmun Nesa Peyari, language and literature
 Sayeba Akhter, medicine
 Bangladesh Fisheries Research Institute, research

2021
It was awarded to 21 persons.
 Motahar Hossain Talukdar, language movement (posthumous)
 Md. Shamsul Haque, language movement (posthumous)
 Afsar Uddin Ahmed, language movement (posthumous)
 Papia Sarwar, music
 Raisul Islam Asad, performing arts
 Salma Begum Sujata, performing arts
 Ahmed Iqbal Haider, drama
 Syed Salahuddin Zaki, film
 Bhaskar Bandopandhay, recitation 
 Pavel Rahman, photography 
 Golam Hasnayen, Liberation War
 Fazlur Rahman Faruque, Liberation War
 Syeda Issabela, Liberation War (posthumous) 
 Ajoy Dasgupta, Journalism  
 Samir Kumar Saha, research
 Mahfuza Khanam, education
 Mirza Abdul Jalil, economics 
 Kazi Kamruzzaman, social service
 Quazi Rosy,  language and literature
 Bulbul Chowdhury,  language and literature 
 Ghulam Murshid, language and literature

2022 
In 2022, 24 people of the country were awarded "Ekushey Padak 2022" for their special contribution in various fields.
 Mostafa MA Matin, language movement
 Mirza Tofazzal Hossain Mukul, language movement
 Motiur Rahman, Liberation War
 Syed Muazzem Ali, Liberation War
 QABM Rahman, Liberation War
 Amjad Ali Khandaker, Liberation War
 Zeenat Barkatullah, Performing dance
 Nazrul Islam Babu, Music
 Iqbal Ahmed, Music
 Mahmudur Rahman Benu, Music
 Khaled Khan, acting
 Afzal Hossain, acting
 Masum Aziz, acting
 MA Malek, Journalism
 Goutam Buddha Das, Education
 SM Abraham Lincoln, Social work
 Gyanashree Mahathero, Social work
 Anwar Hossain, Science and technology
 Kamal Chowdhury, Language and literature
 Jharna Das Purkayastha, Language and literature
 MA Sattar Mandal, Research
 Md. Enamul Haque, Research (As a team he is the team leader)
 Shahanaz Sultana, Research (Group)
 Jannatul Ferdous, Research (Group)

2023 
2 organizations and 19 individuals.
 Bidyanondo Foundation
 Bangladesh National Museum
 Khaleda Manzoor-e-Khuda (Language Movement)
 AKM Shamsul Haque (Language Movement; posthumously)
 Haji Mohammad Majibor Rahman (Language Movement)
 Masud Ali Khan (acting)
 Shimul Yousuf (acting)
 Manoranjan Ghoshal (music)
 Gazi Abdul Hakim (music)
 Fazal-e-Khuda (music; posthumously)
 Jayanta Chattopadhyay (recitation)
 Nawazish Ali Khan (shilpakala)
 Kanak Chanpa Chakma (painting)
 Momtaz Uddin (Liberation War; posthumously)
 Shah Alamgir (journalism; posthumously)
 Abdul Majid (research)
 Mazharul Islam (education; posthumously) 
 Saidul Haque (social service)
 Manjurul Imam (politics; posthumously) 
 Akhter Uddin Mia (politics, posthumously) 
 Moniruzzaman (language and literature)

References

Civil awards and decorations of Bangladesh
Recipients of the Ekushey Padak